Brook Sykes, also known as Brook Rowan (born 20 September 1984), is an Australian actor born in Melbourne. He played Garth King in the Wicked Science TV series. He also appeared as James Gribble in the popular TV series, Round the Twist.

Filmography 

Dirt Game (appeared in two episodes – as Luke – 2009)Wicked Science – as Garth King (First season: 2004; Second season: 2005–2006)Blue Heelers (appeared in one episode only; "Good Times" – as Jeff Radley – 2005)You and Your Stupid Mate – as Sparks (2005)Stingers (appeared in one episode only; "Break and Enter" – as Mayvo – 2004)Round the Twist'' – as Gribbs (2000–2001)

References 
 

1984 births
Australian male film actors
Australian male television actors
Australian male child actors
People from Victoria (Australia)
Living people